The Pulsnitz  or Połčnica (Sorbian) is a river in Saxony and Brandenburg, Germany. It is a left tributary of the Black Elster, which it joins in Elsterwerda. Other towns on the Pulsnitz are Pulsnitz, Königsbrück and Ortrand.

See also
List of rivers of Brandenburg
List of rivers of Saxony

Rivers of Brandenburg
Rivers of Saxony
Rivers of Germany